Saint Brendan's is an Irish cream liqueur.

St. Brendan's or Saint Brendan or variation, may also refer to:

People
 St. Brendan the Voyager Navigator of Clonfert (c. AD 484–c. 577), Irish monastic saint
 Saint Brendan of Birr (died 573), Abbot of Birr in Co. Offaly, contemporaneous with the above

Places
 St. Brendan's, Newfoundland and Labrador, Canada
 Saint Brendan's Island, a phantom island
 St Brendan's Park, Ireland

Institutions
 Saint Brendan Church (disambiguation)
 St. Brendan's College (disambiguation)
 St. Brendan's Sixth Form College, Bristol, England
 St. Brendan High School, a catholic high school in Miami, Florida, U.S.
 St. Brendan School, a catholic college-preparatory school in Riverside, Rhode Island, U.S.
 St. Brendan's Hospital (disambiguation)

Other uses
 St Brendan's GAA (disambiguation)

See also
 Brendan (disambiguation)
 
 
 Saint Brandon of Man, Bishop of Man